Mental Notes is the fifth studio album by English 2 tone and ska band Bad Manners, released in 1985 by Portrait Records.

Track listing
All songs by Bad Manners unless noted.

Side one
 "What the Papers Say" – 2:54
 "Blue Summer" – 3:42
 "Body Talk" – 3:41
 "Tossin' in My Sleep" – 3:50
 "Tie Me Up" (Ney Smith) – 2:00

Side two
"Bang the Drum All Day" (Todd Rundgren) – 3:18
 "Destination Unknown" 3:15
 "Mountain of Love" – 3:28
 "Work" – 3:19
 "Saturday Night" – 2:46

Personnel
 Buster Bloodvessel – lead vocals; production
 Louis Alphonso – guitar
 Martin Stewart – keyboards
 Stevie Smith – harmonica
 Chris Kane – tenor saxophone
 Paul Hyman – trumpet
 Andy Marsden – alto saxophone
 David Farren – bass
 Brian Tuitt – drums
 Jimmy Scott – percussion

References

External links

1985 albums
Bad Manners albums
Portrait Records albums